Bandish, cheez or gat is a fixed, melodic composition in Hindustani vocal or instrumental music. It is set in a specific raga, performed with rhythmic accompaniment by a tabla or pakhawaj, a steady drone, and melodic accompaniment by a sarangi, violin or harmonium. There are different ways of systematizing the parts of a composition. A bandish provides the literature element in the music, for standard structured singing. In the past many gharanas protected their bandishes from moving out of the family with gross incoherent vocal renditions. In the realm of vocal music, it is often known as cheez.

Etymology
The word bandish is derived from the Hindustani language, and literally means "binding together".

Sections
Sthāyī or Asthāyī: The initial, Rondo phrase or line of a fixed, melodic composition.

Antarā: The second body phrase or line of a fixed, melodic composition.

Sanchāri: The third body phrase or line of a fixed, melodic composition, seen more typically in Dhrupad bandishes.

Aabhog: The fourth and concluding body phrase or line of a fixed, melodic composition, seen more typically in Dhrupad bandishes.

Tempo
There are three variations of Bandish, regarding tempo:

Vilambit Bandish: A slow and steady melodic composition, usually in Largo to Adagio speeds.

Madhyalaya Bandish: A medium tempo melodic composition, usually set in Andante to Allegretto speeds.

Drut Bandish: A fast tempo melodic composition, usually set to Allegretto speed, and onwards.

Few List Bandish Compositions

See also

References

Indian styles of music
Hindustani music genres
Musical form
Hindustani music terminology